Jevne Township is a township in Aitkin County, Minnesota, United States. The population was 322 as of the 2010 census.

History
Jevene was the name of a pioneer family of Scandinavian settlers.

Geography

A portion of the city of McGregor extends into the township but is a separate entity.

Major highways
  Minnesota State Highway 65
  Minnesota State Highway 210

Lakes
 Bass Lake
 Davis Lake
 Portage Lake (northeast quarter)
 Rock Lake
 Round Lake
 Steamboat Lake
 Town Line Lake (vast majority)
 Turner Lake

Adjacent townships
 Workman Township (north)
 Shamrock Township (northeast)
 McGregor Township (east)
 Kimberly Township (southwest)
 Fleming Township (west)
 Logan Township (northwest)

Cemeteries
The township contains Lansford Cemetery.

Demographics
As of the census of 2000, there were 321 people, 131 households, and 94 families residing in the township.  The population density was 9.4 people per square mile (3.6/km2).  There were 298 housing units at an average density of 8.7/sq mi (3.4/km2).  The racial makeup of the township was 98.44% White, 0.31% Native American, 0.62% Asian, and 0.62% from two or more races.

There were 131 households, out of which 29.0% had children under the age of 18 living with them, 63.4% were married couples living together, 3.8% had a female householder with no husband present, and 28.2% were non-families. 26.0% of all households were made up of individuals, and 7.6% had someone living alone who was 65 years of age or older.  The average household size was 2.45 and the average family size was 2.91.

In the township the population was spread out, with 27.1% under the age of 18, 3.7% from 18 to 24, 22.4% from 25 to 44, 29.6% from 45 to 64, and 17.1% who were 65 years of age or older.  The median age was 42 years. For every 100 females, there were 115.4 males.  For every 100 females age 18 and over, there were 122.9 males.

The median income for a household in the township was $33,333, and the median income for a family was $41,500. Males had a median income of $31,964 versus $18,750 for females. The per capita income for the township was $15,689.  About 4.8% of families and 15.9% of the population were below the poverty line, including 21.4% of those under age 18 and 13.3% of those age 65 or over.

References
 United States National Atlas
 United States Census Bureau 2007 TIGER/Line Shapefiles
 United States Board on Geographic Names (GNIS)

Townships in Aitkin County, Minnesota
Townships in Minnesota